Bolstadfjorden is a  long fjord in Vaksdal and Voss municipalities in Vestland county, Norway. The Bolstadfjorden is a branch of Veafjorden and a continuation of Vikafjorden. Vikafjorden meets Bolstadstraumen at Straume and the mouth of Bolstadfjorden. It is the innermost point of the fjord system surrounding the city of Bergen.

There is a threshold at  creating two basins, the outer . The Vosso river flows into Bolstadfjorden and brings freshwater from a  catchment area. Freshwater inflow peaks in May to June. Freshwater or brackish water on the surface obstructs circulation of the heavier saltwater leaving the saltwater in the deeper part deprived of oxygen.

The main road from Bergen-Voss-Oslo (European route E16) runs along the south shores of the fjord. The Voss Line originally ran along the south shore, partly through 10 short tunnels.

See also
 List of Norwegian fjords

References

Fjords of Vestland
Vaksdal
Voss